Kourosh Molaei Sefiddashti (born 27 November 1974 in Abadan, Iran) was an amateur boxer from Iran, who competed in the 1996 Summer Olympics in the middleweight (75 kg) division and lost in the first round to Rhoshii Wells of the United States.

References

External links
 

1974 births
Living people
Iranian male boxers
Olympic boxers of Iran
Boxers at the 1996 Summer Olympics
Middleweight boxers
People from Abadan, Iran
Sportspeople from Khuzestan province
20th-century Iranian people